The 12055/12056 Dehradun–New Delhi Jan Shatabdi Express is an Express belonging to Indian Railways that runs between  &  in India. It is a daily service. It operates as train number 12056 from Dehradun to New Delhi and as train number 12055 in the reverse direction.

Coaches 

It has 4 standard Jan Shatabdi Express AC Chair Car & 9 2nd Class Non - AC seating coaches with 2 general coach. As with most train services in India, coach composition may be amended at the discretion of Indian Railways depending on demand.

Service 

It is a daily train & covers the distance of 305 kilometres in 6 hours as 12056 Dehradun Jan Shatabdi Express (50.83 km/hr) & 303 kilometres 5 hours 45 mins as 12055 New Delhi–Dehradun Jan Shatabdi Express (52.70 km/hr).

Traction 

It is hauled end to end by a WAP-5 / WAP-7 engine from the Ghaziabad electric loco shed. Earlier it used to be hauled by a WDM-3A / WDP-3A from Tughlakabad diesel loco shed.

Time Table 

12055 New Delhi–Dehradun Jan Shatabdi Express leaves New Delhi every day and reaches Dehradun the same day.

12056 Dehradun–New Delhi Jan Shatabdi Express leaves Dehradun every day and reaches New Delhi the same day.

Halts & schedule

12055

12056

Routeing 

External links 
Jan Shatabdi Express

Jan Shatabdi Express trains
Rail transport in Delhi
Trains from Dehradun